Auburn is a city in Cayuga County, New York, United States. Located at the north end of Owasco Lake, one of the Finger Lakes in Central New York, the city had a population of 26,866 at the 2020 census. It is the largest city of Cayuga County, the county seat, and the site of the maximum-security Auburn Correctional Facility, as well as the William H. Seward House Museum and the house of abolitionist Harriet Tubman.

History 

The region around Auburn had been Haudenosaunee territory for centuries before European contact and historical records.

Auburn was founded in 1793, during the post-Revolutionary period of settlement of western New York. The founder, John L. Hardenbergh, was a veteran of the Sullivan-Clinton campaign against the Iroquois during the American Revolution. Hardenbergh settled in the vicinity of the Owasco River with his infant daughter and two African-American indentured servants, Harry and Kate Freeman. After his death in 1806, Hardenbergh was buried in Auburn's North Street Cemetery, and was re-interred in 1852 in Fort Hill Cemetery – the first burial in the city's newly opened burial ground. The community grew up around Hardenbergh's gristmill and sawmill.

Originally known as Hardenbergh's Corners in the town of Aurelius, the settlement was renamed Auburn in 1805 when it became the county seat. It became an incorporated village in 1815, and was chartered as a city in 1848. It was only a few miles from the Erie Canal, which opened in 1825 and allowed local factories to inexpensively ship goods north or south. In 1871, the Southern Central Railroad, financed by the Lehigh Valley Railroad, completed a line primarily to carry anthracite coal from Athens, Pennsylvania through Auburn to wharves on Lake Ontario at Fair Haven.

From 1818 to 1939, Auburn was home to Auburn Theological Seminary, one of the preeminent theological seminaries in the United States. In 1939, facing financial difficulties as a result of the Great Depression, the seminary moved to the campus of Union Theological Seminary in New York City. The only building from the Auburn Theological Seminary that stands today is Willard Memorial Chapel and the adjacent Welch Memorial Hall on Nelson Street, designed by Andrew Jackson Warner of Rochester, with stained-glass windows and interior decoration by Louis Comfort Tiffany. It is the only complete and unaltered Tiffany chapel interior known to exist.

In 1816, Auburn Prison (now the Auburn Correctional Facility) was founded as a model for the contemporary ideas about treating prisoners, known now as the Auburn system. Visitors were charged a fee for viewing the facility and its inmates. On August 6, 1890, the first execution by the electric chair was carried out at Auburn Prison. In 1901 Leon Czolgosz, assassin of President William McKinley, was executed there. Although the ideas of the Auburn System have been abandoned, the prison continues to serve as a maximum security facility, and is one of the most secure prisons in the continental United States.

Geography
Auburn is located at 42.9317° N, 76.5661° W at the north end of Owasco Lake, one of the Finger Lakes, which is drained by the Owasco Outlet – also known as the Owasco River – which runs north through the city on its way to the Seneca River. A dam, owned and operated by the city, controls the outflow of the lake, which is used for drinking water and recreation. The city is required to keep a sufficient amount of water in the river to deal with the effluent from its waste disposal treatment facility.

US 20 is an important east-west highway passing through the city, and New York State Route 34 and New York State Route 38 are north-south highways that intersect US-20 in Auburn.

Climate
This climatic region is typified by large seasonal temperature differences, with warm to hot (and often humid) summers and cold (sometimes severely cold) winters. According to the Köppen Climate Classification system, Auburn has a humid continental climate, abbreviated "Dfb" on climate maps.

Demographics 

As of the census of 2000, there were 28,574 people, 11,411 households, and 6,538 families residing in the city. The population density was 3,405.3 people per square mile (1,315.0/km). There were 12,637 housing units at an average density of 1,506.0 per square mile (581.5/km). The racial makeup of the city was 88.57% White, 7.59% African American, 0.29% Native American, 0.57% Asian, 0.02% Pacific Islander, 1.41% from other races, and 1.55% from two or more races. Hispanic or Latino people of any race were 2.82% of the population.

There were 11,411 households, out of which 28.1% had children under the age of 18 living with them, 37.3% were married couples living together, 14.7% had a female householder with no partner present, and 42.7% were non-families. 36.3% of all households were made up of individuals, and 16.6% had someone living alone who was 65 years of age or older. The average household size was 2.27 and the average family size was 2.98.

In the city, the population was spread out, with 22.8% under the age of 18, 9.3% from 18 to 24, 30.3% from 25 to 44, 19.8% from 45 to 64, and 17.8% who were 65 years of age or older. The median age was 37 years. For every 100 females, there were 99.0 males. For every 100 females age 18 and over, there were 97.8 males.

The median income for a household in the city was $30,281, and the median income for a family was $41,169. Males had a median income of $32,349 versus $23,330 for females. The per capita income for the city was $17,083. About 12.5% of families and 16.5% of the population were below the poverty line, including 23.9% of those under age 18 and 10.2% of those age 65 or over.

Education 
The Auburn Enlarged City School District is the public school system serving Auburn. It currently operates seven schools covering grades K–12. West Middle School was closed over the summer of 2011 to save funds, with the student population merged into East Middle School.

The only college in Auburn is Cayuga Community College, a two-year school. C.C.C., as it is known locally, is located on Franklin Street. The city had been the home of Auburn Theological Seminary, a Presbyterian institution established in 1818, which relocated to New York City in 1939.

Sports

Professional baseball 
Auburn has had a long association with professional baseball. The Auburn Cayugas and other early Auburn teams played as members of the League Alliance (1877), Central New York League (1888), New York State League (1889, 1897–1899), Empire State League (1906–1907), Canadian–American League (1938, 1940) and Border League (1946–1951). Auburn was an affiliate of the Boston Red Sox (1948).

Today, Auburn is home to the Auburn Doubledays, members on the collegiate wooden bat Perfect Game Collegiate Baseball League.

National Association of Professional Baseball Leagues 
In late 1901, Auburn became the headquarters of the National Association of Professional Baseball Leagues (NAPBL), which is now known simply as Minor League Baseball and based in St. Petersburg, Florida. John H. Farrell, who served as secretary-treasurer of the league for many years, was a local resident, and the league's offices remained in the city while he remained in that role.

Auburn Community Baseball 
Auburn Community Baseball, which is owned by the City of Auburn, is the parent organization of the Auburn Doubledays and its predecessor Auburn entries in the Class A short-season New York–Penn League dating back to 1958. The team plays its home games at Leo Pinckney Field at Falcon Park. Until 2020 they were members of the New York-Penn League.

The Great Race 
Since 1978, on the second Sunday of every August, Auburn hosts "The Great Race", a three- or four-person relay race involving running, cycling, and canoeing (or kayaking). The race begins and ends in the area of Owasco Lake on the southern outskirts of Auburn. With between 2,000 and 2,500 people participating in an average year, it is one of the largest relay races in the United States.

Media 

The daily newspaper published in Auburn is The Citizen, which dates back to 1816, and had previously been published as The Daily Advertiser and The Citizen-Advertiser. It serves Auburn and Cayuga County, as well as other parts of Central New York. A morning paper, published seven days a week, it has a circulation of 10,000 for the daily and Saturday editions, and 12,000 on Sunday. It is owned by Lee Enterprises.

Notable people 

Possibly the two best-known historical figures associated with Auburn are Harriet Tubman and William H. Seward.

Seward, who served as a New York state senator, the governor of New York, a U.S. senator, a presidential candidate, and then Secretary of State under presidents Abraham Lincoln and Andrew Johnson, in which role he negotiated the 1867 purchase from Russia of Alaska, which became known as "Seward's Folly" – lived in Auburn from 1823 until his death in 1872, and was opposed to slavery. Seward's wife, Frances Adeline Seward, was deeply committed to the abolitionist movement, which was strongly supported in Auburn. In the 1850s, the Seward family opened their Auburn home as a safehouse to fugitive slaves on the Underground Railroad. In 1859 Seward sold a plot of land to abolitionist Tubman, who used it to create a safe haven for her family and friends and other black Americans seeking a better life in the north. Seward's house is now a historical museum, and both it and Tubman's house are on the National Register of Historic Places.

Business and inventors 
 Willard Bundy, invented first time clock
 Theodore Case, developed the first commercially successful system of recording sound on film
 Jerome H. Holland, first African-American board member of the American Stock Exchange
 Birdsill Holly, supposed inventor of the fire hydrant
 Phil Romano, restaurateur, founder of Fuddruckers and Romano's Macaroni Grill

Government, politics, and law 
 Harry Elmer Barnes, historian, scholar and social scientist
 John Beardsley (1783–1857), judge, assemblyman, state senator and warden of Auburn state prison
 Samuel Blatchford, Associate Justice of the United States Supreme Court
 William H. Carpenter, U.S. Consul to Foochow, China, 1861–1865
 Lisa Colella, Founder, Healing Household 6, the first family violence organization for military families, 2019 Medal of Honor Community Service Hero Honoree, Family Advisor for Department of Veterans Affairs Intimate Partner Violence Assistance Program
 William Miller Collier, diplomat, attorney, president of George Washington University, author of Collier on Bankruptcy
 Alfred Conkling Coxe Sr., federal judge
 Amy Dacey, Democratic National Committee, CEO
 Ulysses F. Doubleday, congressman, father of Abner Doubleday
 Eleanor Lansing Dulles, diplomat
 Nathaniel B. Eldredge, congressman
 William Fulton, author, urban planner, 52nd mayor of Ventura, California
 Milo Goodrich, congressman
 Jerome Holland, first African American ambassador to a European nation (Sweden, 1972); president of Hampton University
 Thomas Y. Howe, Jr., mayor and congressman
 James Lockhart, congressman from Indiana
 Virginia V. Lyons, politician
 Clinton D. MacDougall, congressman
 Truman A. Merriman, congressman
 Lithgow Osborne, diplomat, first American ambassador to Norway after World War II
 Thomas Mott Osborne, prison reformer 
 Sereno E. Payne, first House Majority Leader
 Theodore Pomeroy, speaker of the house and mayor
 Frederick W. Seward, assistant secretary of state
 William G. Stahlnecker, congressman
 John Taber, congressman
 Enos T. Throop, 10th Governor of New York
 Floyd K. Whittlemore, Illinois state treasurer
 Martha Coffin Wright, feminist and participant in the Seneca Falls convention

Military 
 Abner Doubleday, general; for many years credited as the creator of baseball
 Leonard E. Rea, major general in the Marine Corps during World War II
 William H. Seward Jr., brevet brigadier general
 William J. Sharkey, naval officer
 Robert F. Stryker, Vietnam War Medal of Honor recipient

Sports, arts, and entertainment 
 Eric Adams (real name Louis Marullo), Manowar singer
 Samuel Hopkins Adams, author
 Kelly Brannigan, model (Deal or No Deal)
 John Chester Buttre, artist and publisher of The American Portrait Gallery
 Scott Columbus, Manowar drummer
 Earl Conrad (birth name Eli Cohen), journalist, author
 Richard and John Contiguglia, twin pianists
 Joey DeMaio, Manowar bassist
 Greg Downing, lacrosse player
 Charles Loring Elliott, portrait painter
 Joey Foster Ellis, artist
 Buddy Hardeman, football running back
 Raymond Hitchcock, actor
 Mark Jindrak, ex-WWE wrestler
 Joe Kehoskie, baseball agent
 Bucky Lawless, boxer (real name Thomas Lawless)
 Tim Locastro, Major League Baseball player
 John, Mike, and Tom Mansell, major league baseball players
 Marijane Meaker, award-winning author of young adult fiction (as "M.E. Kerr")
 Pete Mendillo, Musician, Drummer : Toured and recorded with Survivor, Jimi Jamison, Dick Wagner, Savoy Brown, Brian Howe, Brad Whitford, Mickey Thomas and Starship. Bobby Kimball (Toto)
 T. J. Middleton, tennis player
 Jeremy Morin, NHL player
 Bob Mosher, TV and film writer
 Jerry O'Neil, NASCAR driver
 Jane Peyton, actress wife of Samuel Hopkins Adams
 Kevin Polcovich, Major League Baseball player
 Julius Schweinfurth, architect
 Stanley Shakespeare, NFL player
 Sir James Jebusa Shannon, artist
 Alexander Theobald Van Laer, painter
 John Walsh, host of America's Most Wanted and The Hunt with John Walsh
 Thommie Walsh, dancer, choreographer and director

Other 
 Avery Robert Dulles, cardinal and theologian
 William Kemmler, Auburn Prison inmate, first person executed by electric chair
 Michael Lynch, geneticist
 A. T. Mann, astrologer, architect and graphic artist
 Harriet Mann Miller (1831–1918), writer, ornithologist
 Irene Sargent (1852–1932), American art historian
 Frederick Starr, professor and anthropologist
 Annie Edson Taylor, the first person to survive a trip over Niagara Falls in a barrel

Business and economy
 Auburn Bearing & Manufacturing (1898), designer and manufacturer of ball and roller thrust bearings
 D&W Performance (1976), performance engine and drivetrain component distributor.

Places of historic interest 
A number of properties in Auburn are listed on the National Register of Historic Places, including the Auburn Button Works and Logan Silk Mills, the Belt-Gaskin House, Case Memorial-Seymour Library, the Cayuga County Courthouse and Clerk's Office, the Harriet Tubman Home for the Aged, William and Mary Hosmer House, St. Peter's Episcopal Church Complex, Sand Beach Church, Schines Auburn Theatre, Thompson AME Zion Church, Harriet Tubman Grave, Harriet Tubman House, the Old Post Office and Courthouse, Fort Hill Cemetery, Wall Street Methodist Episcopal Church, and Dr. Sylvester Willard Mansion. The William H. Seward House and Willard Memorial Chapel-Welch Memorial Hall are National Historic Landmarks, and the South Street Area Historic District is a national historic district.

In 2018, the NYS Equal Rights Heritage Center opened to the public, serving as a visitors' center and permanent exhibition promoting the region's history and culture. The center guides visitors to the variety of historical sites in the region connected to the struggle for equal rights.

See also

References 
Notes

External links 

 City of Auburn official website
 Seymour Library

 
Populated places established in 1793
Cities in New York (state)
County seats in New York (state)
Cities in Cayuga County, New York
1793 establishments in New York (state)